Aaron Brocklehurst (born June 10, 1985) is a Canadian professional ice hockey defenceman who last played for the Sheffield Steelers of the Elite Ice Hockey League (EIHL).

Career 
After playing in the BCHL, Brocklehurst enrolled at St. Cloud State University in 2004.

He turned pro in 2008 and signed with the Florida Everblades of the ECHL, before transferring to fellow ECHL outfit Victoria Salmon Kings. His 2008-09 season also included a brief stint at AHL's Lake Erie Monsters.

Brocklehurst gained more ECHL experience during the 2009-10 campaign, suiting up for the Gwinnett Gladiators and the Reading Royals.

In the 2010–11 season, Brocklehurst left for Europe and signed with Lukko of the Finnish SM-liiga. After a mid-season transfer to Pelicans, Brocklehurst extended for a further one-year extension. On June 8, 2012, Brocklehurst left Finland and signed a one-year contract in Germany with EHC Wolfsburg of the DEL.

Whilst leading the Wolfsburg defence with 30 points in 48 games during the 2012–13 season, Brocklehurst was re-signed to a one-year extension on February 13, 2013. After two successful and productive seasons from the Grizzly Adams blueline, Brocklehurst opted to transfer to fellow DEL club, ERC Ingolstadt on May 12, 2014.

After one season with Ingolstadt, Brocklehurst left the DEL for the neighbouring league, the EBEL, signing a one-year contract with Hungarian club, Alba Volán Székesfehérvár on July 9, 2015. However, he parted company with the club during the season and headed back to Germany: In February 2016, he agreed on a deal with the Hamburg Freezers for the remainder of the 2015-16 season.

Brocklehurst returned to the EBEL for the 2016–17 season, signing with the Vienna Capitals on July 6, 2016. Brocklehurst remained with the Capitals for two seasons before agreeing to terms with his third EBEL club, EHC Black Wings Linz, on April 16, 2018. In the 2018–19 season with the Black Wings, Brocklehurst continued to contribute from the blueline, posting 6 goals and 28 points in 52 games. He opted to not take up the option of his contract with the Black Wings and left as a free agent following a quarterfinal playoff defeat.

On July 12, 2019, Brocklehurst agreed to a one-year contract with English EIHL club, the Sheffield Steelers.

Career statistics

References

External links

1985 births
Living people
Fehérvár AV19 players
EHC Black Wings Linz players
Canadian ice hockey defencemen
Florida Everblades players
Gwinnett Gladiators players
Hamburg Freezers players
Ice hockey people from British Columbia
ERC Ingolstadt players
Lake Erie Monsters players
Lukko players
Lahti Pelicans players
Reading Royals players
St. Cloud State Huskies men's ice hockey players
Sportspeople from Nanaimo
Victoria Salmon Kings players
Vienna Capitals players
Grizzlys Wolfsburg players
Sheffield Steelers players
Canadian expatriate ice hockey players in Austria
Canadian expatriate ice hockey players in Hungary
Canadian expatriate ice hockey players in Finland
Canadian expatriate ice hockey players in Germany